Khanh Dai Pham is a Vietnamese-born American aerospace engineer. He is noted for his work in statistical optimal control theory, game-theoretic operations research of military satellite communications, space control autonomy, and
space domain awareness and the government leadership in innovation ecosystem and coalition of government agencies, small business and industry. He is a Fellow of the Air Force Research Laboratory, the National Academy of Inventors, the Institution of Engineering and Technology, the Society of Photo-Optical Instrumentation Engineers, the Royal Aeronautical Society, the International Association for the Advancement of Space Safety, and the Royal Astronomical Society. He is also a Fellow of the Institute of Electrical and Electronics Engineers (IEEE) and the American Astronautical Society (AAS), and an Associate Fellow of the American Institute of Aeronautics and Astronautics (AIAA).

At the Air Force Research Laboratory/Space Vehicles Directorate, Pham's research, development and acquisition activities have involved in game-theoretic operations research with potential space domain awareness, space control, military satellite communications, satellite navigation applications. As an adjunct research professor of electrical and computer engineering at the University of New Mexico, he investigates on a range of topics on stochastic control and satellite communications. He has brought the broader services in stimulating small business innovation, meeting the Air Force and DoD R&D needs, broadening participation in innovation and entrepreneurship, and boosting commercialization derived from Air Force and DoD R&D. Pham's published works span in more than 300 books, book chapters, peer-reviewed journal articles and conference proceedings, including the technical areas of space domain awareness, space control, cognitive satellite radios, resilient satellite navigation, dynamic sensor resource allocation, and game-theoretic operations research.

Early life and education
Pham was born in Saigon, Vietnam, to Pham Viet Son and Bang Kim Linh. His grandfathers were Pham Van Son (the historian, war journalist, and military officer) and Bang Ba Lan (the poet, photographer, literature teacher, journalist, and artist). His parents who were Majors in the Republic of Vietnam, served in the U.S.-backed South Vietnam government during the Vietnam War and became prisoners of war from 1975 to 1982. Under the joint U.S.-Vietnam Humanitarian Resettlement Program and Orderly Departure Program Category of Humanitarian Operations, he and his family came to the U.S. in the early 1990s. At the time, he was a second-year college student in electrical and electronics engineering of at the Ho Chi Minh University of Technology and Education in Ho Chi Minh City, Vietnam. He attended Lincoln High School in Lincoln, Nebraska, graduating three years after arriving in U.S. While at Lincoln High School, he attended the Southeast Community College-Lincoln campus, where he earned a degree of Associate of Applied Science with the highest distinction in electronic systems technology.

In the late 1990s, Pham went on to earn Bachelor (magna cum laude) and Master of Science degrees in electrical engineering from University of Nebraska, and in 2004 he received a Doctor of Philosophy in electrical engineering from University of Notre Dame under the support of the four-year Arthur Schmidt Presidential Fellowship - making contributions to fundamental understanding of performance uncertainty quantification and management in stochastic dynamical systems.

Career
Pham began his professional career at the Air Force Research Laboratory (AFRL) in 2004 as an aerospace engineer after undertaking a one-year research associate position at University of Notre Dame. His more than 17 years of service includes a variety of positions and assignments, ranging from basic science researcher, technical lead, project manager, contracting officer technical representative, and government lab advisor across Advanced Spacecraft Mechanisms, Dynamics & Control and Decision Support Systems programs within the Advanced Spacecraft Components Technology branch, honing his subject matter expertise in modeling and simulation, estimation, multi-asset autonomy, and multi-level data sensor fusion. He brought systems-theoretic science and control engineering principles, together with teamwork and interdisciplinary to develop technical solutions in solving warfighter engineering problems, various areas of specific focus for increased activities in space control and space domain awareness.

He contributed to the analysis capability on satellite defense control. The Air Force Materiel Command Commander (General Bruce Carlson) recognized Pham with the Air Force Outstanding Scientist – Junior Civilian Award. His efforts helped US Space Force develop satellite pursuit-evasion approaches to assess space command & control autonomy. For these research achievements, he received the Air Force Civilian Achievement Medal.

Pham's basic science and knowledge discovery published with Springer Verlag, entitled "Linear-Quadratic Controls in Risk-Averse Decision Making: Performance-Measure Statistics and Control Decision Optimization," ISBN 978-1-4614-5078-8 and "Resilient Controls for Ordering Uncertain Prospects: Change and Response," Springer Optimization and Its Applications, Vol. 98, ISBN 978-3-319-08704-7. Ideas of his independent studies helped pioneer higher-order statistics of performance measures from stochastic control of linear-quadratic dynamical systems in performance variation corrections from performance risk preferences. The techniques and methods Pham developed are becoming standards and used by many high-fidelity modeling/simulation tools for space object localization and trajectory monitoring applications. As demands for high performance engineering systems continue to increase, his Springer seminal monographs helped quantifying and managing performance uncertainty – how much performance guarantees and resiliency can be designed in complex and adaptable aerospace platforms.

He was selected by the U.S. DoD as the DoD Laboratory Scientist of the Quarter, third quarter 2019, acknowledging his work in some core focus research areas of autonomous radio sensing, precision multi-user access, and cognitive radio resource management. The results have been delivering innovation and new technology to industry and Air Force programs by finding ways for new space communications technologies to better withstand contested radio environments. Allowing these space communication technologies to be resilient in extreme radio conditions enables more of the space-layer elements for joint all-domain command and control; ambient connectivity; and position, navigation, and timing to the warfighter. All of these may translate into closer standoff proximity operations in warfighting contested environments.

Government services for academia and R&D community at large
Since 2004, Pham's government services have continued to expand from gaining technical knowledge to leading diverse teams of technical professionals across multiple theaters that include forethoughts, cultural differences and multidisciplinary teamwork. He has brought more Asian American Pacific Islander people in Federal services who may have never considered Federal jobs. Working for the AFRL has allowed him to lead, plan, drive strategy, and move from an engineer, to a scientist, and an eventual leadership role.

Pham has served as a research adviser for the National Academies’ Associate Research Programs. In this capacity, he initiates various DoD relevant research opportunities on military space capability concepts for the Air Force Summer Faculty Fellowship for American Society of Engineering Education. He has served on various panels across evaluation committees for National Science Foundation Graduate Fellowship, National Defense Science & Engineering Graduate Fellowship and Young Investigator Research Program of the Air Force Office of Scientific Research. Among his pedagogical achievements, Pham - an adjunct research professor for the Electrical and Computer Engineering Department at the University of New Mexico, has served on multiple dissertation and thesis committees. In these roles, he has advised and mentored numerous science, technology, engineering, and mathematics (STEM)-focused graduate students. He works closely with government and academic partners to promote the value of the National Science Foundation and DoD National Defense Science & Engineering Graduate Fellowship program as a critical component of DoD workforce development. As the recipient of both 2018 Society of Asian Scientists and Engineers (SASE) - Leadership of the Year (Government Category) Award and 2019 SASE - Professional Achievements Award, he has not only demonstrated technical leadership to make innovation happened, but also has led by examples with the community leadership and support the Asian American Pacific Islander community with a path forward where most see obstacles.

In addition, Pham is concerned with innovation-based business development and technology transfers. He has worked with 100 plus high tech small businesses and entrepreneurs that represents the growth and development of so many future leaders and engineers by means of America's Seed Fund and the likes. His technical outreach has impacted multi-million dollars of DoD’s science and technology investments, managed 100s Small Business Innovative Research/Small Business Technology Transfer contracts, and interacted with a number of small business and companies. His efforts throughout led to the fourth Annual Champion of Small Business and Technology Commercialization Award that Pham received in 2018 from the Small Business Technology Council for helping high tech small businesses contribute at higher levels.

Pham has been a leading advocate for the development of game-theoretic operations research in the fields of military science, technology, and engineering in space domain awareness, space control autonomy, and protected satellite communications since 2004. He has organized and chaired diverse conferences on sensors and systems for space applications. He was a distinguished guest lecturer at 2019 International Conference on Telecommunications Hanoi, Vietnam, April 2019, IEEE Military Communication Conference Norfolk, VA, November 2019, and DoD Innovators Spotlight Series. He speaks annually at various conferences (American Control Conference, IEEE Aerospace Conference, IEEE Military Communications Conference, etc.) invited talks and tutorials at American universities. Pham served as the Senior Editor of IEEE Transactions on Aerospace and Electronic Systems for Intelligent Systems from 2015 to 2022 and Guest Editor for IEEE Transactions on Aerospace and Electronic Systems
Special Section on Industrial Information Integration in Space Applications between 2021 and 2022.

Between 2005 and 2007, as a member of the Program Committee for Rocky Mountain Section of the American Astronautical Society on Guidance and Control Conference in Breckenridge, Colorado, Pham authored and chaired the closed sessions on Control Techniques for Deployable & Large Structures. From 2011 to 2014, he served as the technical area chair of Human and Autonomous/Unmanned Systems for AIAA. In addition to his services as panelists, reviewers, published authors, session and track chairs, he was a member of AIAA Technical Committees of Survivability as well as Guidance, Navigation and Control from 2010 to 2017.

Professional achievements and awards
In 2017 and 2018, Pham made appearances and was interviewed for his outstanding achievements on "Voice of America", "The Pride of the Vietnamese" - the largest US international broadcasters celebrating Vietnamese Heritage around the world and the Asian American Engineers of the Year. His professional achievements testify to the fact that the pursuit of fundamental knowledge lies at the heart of technological progress, national security, and international leadership, and it exemplifies the importance of DoD’s cadre of career civilian scientists and engineers.

 Accumulated 28 U.S. Patents
 Asian American Engineers of the Year Award, 2021
 Innovation Award, 2020
 DoD Lab Scientist of the Quarter Award, 2019
 Society of Asian Scientists and Engineers - Professional Achievements Award, 2019
 Arthur S. Flemming Award in Basic Science, 2018
 Publication of the Year Award, 2009, 2014, 2018, 2019, and 2021
 Excellence in Technology Transfer Award, 2018 and 2019
 Society of Asian Scientists and Engineers of the Year - Government Leadership Award, 2018
 Small Business and Technology Council 2018 Champion of Small Business Technology Commercialization Award, 2018
 Excellence in Scientific/Technical Achievement Team Award, 2010 and 2011
 Air Force Civilian Achievement Medal, Department of Air Force, 2009 
 Air Force Outstanding Engineer of the Year, Department of Air Force, 2008

References

Living people
21st-century American engineers
American aerospace engineers
People from Ho Chi Minh City
University of New Mexico faculty
Vietnamese emigrants to the United States
University of Nebraska alumni
University of Notre Dame alumni
Air Force Research Laboratory people
Engineers from Nebraska
People from Lincoln, Nebraska
Year of birth missing (living people)